The 2023 Wexford Senior Hurling Championship is scheduled to be the 113th staging of the Wexford Senior Hurling Championship since its establishment by the Wexford County Board in 1889. The draw for the group stage places took place on 31 January 2023. The championship is scheduled to run from June to August 2023.

Ferns St Aidan's will enter the championship as the defending champions.

Team changes

To Championship

Promoted from the Wexford Intermediate Hurling Championship
 Oulart-the Ballagh

From Championship

Relegated to the Wexford Intermediate Hurling Championship
 Cloughbawn

Group 1

Group 1 table

Group 2

Group 2 table

Knockout stage

Relegation playoff

Quarter-finals

Semi-finals

Final

References

Wexford Senior Hurling Championship
Wexford Senior Hurling Championship
Wexford Senior Hurling Championship